Puli Kiadeh (also Romanized as Pūlī Kīādeh; also known as Polīkīādeh and Pūl Kīādeh) is a village in Harazpey-ye Jonubi Rural District, in the Central District of Amol County, Mazandaran Province, Iran. At the 2006 census, its population was 321, in 87 families.

References 

Populated places in Amol County